Johan Frandsen (born 9 September 1982 in Stockholm, Sweden), is the frontman guitarist, main songwriter and lead vocalist in the Swedish rock band, The Knockouts. His trademark guitar] is a Gretsch White Falcon. Johan Frandsen is an endorsed artist by Gretsch Guitars, TV Jones, Fender and Peerless.

Biography

Music career
Frandsen started playing guitar at the age of six and began his music career forming The Knockouts in 1996 in Stockholm, Sweden. The Knockouts have developed a cult following in Scandinavia and is now considered to be one of Sweden's hardest touring bands. As well as being the main songwriter and frontman of The Knockouts – from 2004 Johan was the lead guitarist with internationally respected Swedish rockabilly band, The GoGetters, having toured over 300 dates with shows all over Europe and the USA. His guitar playing gave them an extra injection energy worldwide - one of the highlights was headlining the Viva Las Vegas and playing with members of the Stray Cats, Guana Batz and Mad Sin.

Johan Frandsen started Diamond Prime Music with The Knockouts' manager Coco Rosenfeld in early 2009. Diamond Prime is a Music and Management company based in Stockholm. Diamond Prime is the record label and management for The Knockouts.

The Knockouts
The Knockouts are a Swedish rock band from Stockholm, formed in 1996. The current lineup consists of Johan Frandsen (vocals, guitar), Kennet Stone (double bass, vocals) and Ted Jergelind (drums).  The band has risen to fame in 2010 after the release of the album Among the Vultures. They have released three studio albums and one EP compilation in Sweden and throughout Europe. The album Among the Vultures was nominated for Best Punk Rock Album at the 2011 Independent Music Awards, and two singles from the album were nominated for best punk song "Heat for the Hunted" and best alternative country song "Ever Been Hurt". The Knockouts added BEST Punk Rock Album to their collection as voted by the industry panel including Joe Perry, Aerosmith, Benji Madden & Joel Madden, Good Charlotte, and Ozzy Osbourne.

Performing hundreds of jam-packed and sold-out shows, The Knockouts have respectively gained a reputation of delivering, what is now described as a “cocky punk rock” sound with an aggressive rockabilly technique.

The Knockouts - recent activity

In 2013 and 2014, The Knockouts have worked to rehearse, record and release the newest studio album ‘’’5000 Miles from Louisville’’, having signed with Swedish Booking Agency MTA Production AB, The Knockouts are back on the road and hitting stages throughout Scandinavia with the newest release in their usual high energy gigs!

2012 saw The Knockouts working on new material for the upcoming album. During this time touring schedules were kept to a minimum and work was directed to the songs for the new release (Due early 2013). A special event was held in September 2012 at Debaser Slussen Stockholm, Sweden. Slim Jim Phantom from the world-famous Stray Cats and Jonny Bowler from the Guana Batz flew from Los Angeles to join The Knockouts on stage in a once only special event to a soldout show, celebrating Johan Frandsen's 30th birthday.

In 2011 The Knockouts supported rock and roll icon and Stray Cats front man Brian Setzer, on the Brian Setzer's Rockabilly Riot tour 2011

They started the European summer with a performance with Brian Sezter on the premiere night of his tour at the 10 year celebration of the Azkena Rock Festival on the June 25, Vitoria-Gasteiz, Spain to crowds of over 50,000 people, then onto sold out dates throughout Germany in Berlin, Hamburg and Cologne. The tour continued to be sold out through Scandinavia with dates in Copenhagen, Denmark, Stockholm, Sweden and Helsinki, Finland ending at the Helsinki Ice Hall (venue capacity of 8200) in Helsinki.
 
Highlight of the tour was the encore performance at the Helsinki Ice Hall on the last night of the tour when The Knockouts frontman Johan Frandsen joined Brian Setzer and Slim Jim Phantom on stage with a special rendition of the rockabilly classic, "Seven Nights to Rock". Setzer called Frandsen to the stage and handed his white Brian Setzer Hot Rod signature Gretsch Guitar to Johan to conclude the tour in Scandinavia.

The Knockouts' tours have included dates throughout Europe including countries such as, Sweden, Finland, Denmark, Germany, Finland, Czech Republic and Spain.

They have played at festivals such as the West Coast Riot and The Peace and Love Festival, alongside Brian Setzer, Social Distortion and The Living End. They supported The Living End' in 2009 on their first Scandinavian tour date for the Raise the Alarm World Tour – in Stockholm.

The Knockouts' beginnings (1996 -2002)
Formed by Johan Frandsen in 1996. Their energetic and hard-fought beginnings were captured with the release of their 1998  self-titled debut 7 inch single The Knockouts, produced by Thomas Skogsberg, (The Hellacopters)
1999 to 2001 was spent touring, writing and preparing to record the full length promotional album Skyline Supernova, recorded in Sunlight Studio, Sweden and released in  summer 2000, and various compilation recordings, including A Fistfull of Rock, Devil Doll Records.
The success of their album scored them national support and the slot on the Hultsfred Festival, playing in the same year as bands such as Iggy Pop and Rocket from the Crypt.

The Knockouts self titled EP (2003-2005)
After devouring two years' worth of gigs, and with a different way of looking at the Swedish punk rock scene, and following from the success of Skyline Supernova, in 2003 the trio went onto solidify its sound with the introduction of longtime drummer Ted Jergelind. Early 2004 saw them head into the studio and record the 4 track EP self-titled The Knockouts. While writing new material during 2004–2006 for their second full-length album and touring Sweden, Germany, Spain, Johan Frandsen (lead vocals, guitar) toured over 300 dates with internationally respected Swedish rockabilly band, The GoGetters'.

The energy and injection of Johan's rockabilly roots and unique "Knockouts" sound, bought a new edge to the GoGetters' and the tour included shows all over Europe and the USA; headlining the Viva Las Vegas, supporting Stray Cats members, and playing with members from Mad Sin and The Guana Batz.

El Fin de la Guerra (2006-2008)
In the midst of a relentless touring schedule between 2006–2008, new songs were bubbling to the surface in what would become El Fin De La Guerra. Recorded in October 2007 and released February 1, 2008 this new album saw the band fly into a massive Europe and USA tour including planned dates in Sweden, Germany, Czech Republic, Finland and the West Coast of the United States. Endorsement deals sees a trademark white guitar appear on stage at the start of 2009 and Johan Frandsen appearing at both National and International guitar conventions. They were busy on the festival circuit in the summer of 2009, including playing Earth Hour in Stockholm, then with The Living End and Social Distortion at The Westcoast Riot festival and the Peace and Love Festival.

Among the Vultures (2009-2011)Among the Vultures, was recorded and produced in six days at The Panic Room, Skara, Sweden.  This full length album is receiving multiple accolades and reviews; ...This album won't leave lovers of quality rock unmoved. It is just so tight, intense, messy, expressive, powerful, explosive... The official single, "Under the Light" is attracting radio play and reviews both in Scandinavia, USA and Europe. The song "Heat for the Hunted" was chosen 3rd on Sweden's National Radio Program - Håkan Persson's Sveriges Radio P3 as the best top ten songs for 2009

5000 Miles From Louisville (2012-2014)
2012 to 2013 saw the band working on the newest album. 5000 Miles From Louisville, was recorded and mixed in ten days in February 2013 at Park Studio Stockholm, Sweden.  It was produced by Stefan Boman, of Park Studio (owned by Swedish band Kent) and Johan Frandsen of The Knockouts. This full-length album is receiving radio plays and reviews;... the catchiness of the beats and melodies grab you, the lyrics hold on tight and refuse to let you go ...The official single, ...'Days Long Gone' hurtles out of the speakers with a confidence and energy that tells me everything I need to know about this record and that is it's going to compete and there's a strength in the outstanding playing and songwriting that places this Scandinavian three piece right at the top of the pack...The album also featured Kevin McKendree on piano on the song “Stars of Us”.

Awards and nominations

 2011: The Knockouts' Among the Vultures was nominated for Best Punk Rock Album at the Independent Music Awards, and two singles from the album were nominated for best punk song Heat for the Hunted and best alternative country song Ever Been Hurt. The Knockouts added BEST Punk Rock Album to their collection as voted by the industry panel including Joe Perry of Aerosmith, Benji Madden and Joel Madden, Good Charlotte, and Ozzy Osbourne.
 2010: The Knockouts were nominated as best upcoming act at the Bandit Rock Awards (Sweden's biggest rock radio station).
 2009: "Heat for the Hunted" from the album Among the Vultures was chosen 3rd on Sweden's National Radio Program Håkan Persson's Sveriges Radio P3 as the best top ten songs for  2009.

Endorsements
Johan Frandsen is currently endorsed artist with:
 Gretsch Guitars
 TV Jones Guitars
 Fender
 Tube Amp Doctor
 Jam Gitarrer

Equipment
2010 saw Frandsen debut as an endorsed artist with TV Jones guitars as a featured artist on the website with Brian Setzer, Chris Cheney and Billy Gibbons. This was soon followed up by support and endorsement from Fender and Gretsch. Johan Frandsen is featured in a two-page spread in FUZZ Magazine June, 2011 issue #4 - The number one and only guitar magazine in Scandinavia. Talking about his inspiration.

On tour, Frandsen uses four main guitars on tour, two Gretsch Guitars and two TV Jones Spectra Sonic  Supremes’ and the rest are back-ups for the different tunings.

Guitars
 Gretsch Chris Cheney Signature G6126TCC
 Gretsch Prototype GGP 6120 TM (Tiger Maple)
 Gretsch Model 6120 Setzer Hot Rod Custom "Pinstripe"
 TV Jones Spectra Sonic Supreme Guitar - Charcoal
 TV Jones Spectra Sonic Supreme Guitar - Cherry Red
 Various other Gretsch, Guild & Gibson Models

Effects:

 Roland Re-301 Chorus Echo

Amplifiers:

 Fender Bassman(Blonde) - 1963
 Fender Supersonic 60 head

Discography

Studio albums
 2000:  Skyline Supernova 2004:  The Knockouts EP Diamond Prime Music
 2007:  El Fin de la Guerra 2009:  Among the Vultures Diamond Prime Music / Sound Pollution AB
 2013: 5000 Miles From Louisville Diamond Prime Music / Sound Pollution AB

Singles
 1998:  "The Knockouts - Can I Look But Not Touch 7" Vinyl
 2009:  "Under the Light" Diamond Prime Music / Sound Pollution AB
 2010:  "Ever Been Hurt" Diamond Prime Music / Sound Pollution AB
 2011:  "A lie like in Natalie" Diamond Prime Music / Sound Pollution AB
 2011:  "I Want you to want me" Diamond Prime Music / Sound Pollution AB
 2013: Days Long Gone Diamond Prime Music / Sound Pollution AB

Compilations
 1998: Fistful of Rock 'N' Roll vol. 9. The Knockouts (Stripshow A Go-Go / Devil Doll Records)
 2011: Dancing on Your Graves – A Rockabilly Tribute to The Hellacopters, The Knockouts', Freeway To Hell (Wild Kingdom/Sound Pollution)

Other projects
 2008: The GoGetters "Hot Rod Roadeo" Goofin Records, Title track from the album Hot Rod Roadeo''

References

External links
 The Knockouts official website
 The Knockouts support Brian Setzer's Rockabilly Riot

1982 births
Living people
Swedish guitarists
Male guitarists
Swedish rock musicians
Swedish rock guitarists
21st-century Swedish singers
21st-century guitarists
21st-century Swedish male singers